Short course swimming at the 2007 Asian Indoor Games was held in Macau Olympic Aquatic Centre, Macau, China from 30 October to 2 November 2007.

Medalists

Men

Women

Medal table

Results

Men

50 m freestyle
30 October

100 m freestyle
2 November

200 m freestyle
1 November

50 m backstroke
31 October

100 m backstroke
1 November

50 m breaststroke
31 October

100 m breaststroke
30 October

50 m butterfly
1 November

100 m butterfly
31 October

100 m individual medley
2 November

200 m individual medley
30 October

4 × 50 m freestyle relay
1 November

4 × 100 m freestyle relay
31 October

4 × 50 m medley relay
30 October

4 × 100 m medley relay
2 November

Women

50 m freestyle
30 October

100 m freestyle
2 November

200 m freestyle
1 November

50 m backstroke
31 October

100 m backstroke
1 November

50 m breaststroke
2 November

100 m breaststroke
30 October

50 m butterfly
1 November

100 m butterfly
31 October

100 m individual medley
2 November

200 m individual medley
30 October

4 × 50 m freestyle relay
1 November

4 × 100 m freestyle relay
31 October

4 × 50 m medley relay
30 October

4 × 100 m medley relay
2 November

References
 2007 Asian Indoor Games official website

2007 Asian Indoor Games events
Asian Indoor Games
2007